The Flag of Sindh is the flag of the Province of Sindh, Pakistan.

Design
The Sindh provincial flag is green and shows the provincial emblem in the centre which includes the major crops of this desert fertile province; cotton, rice, wheat and sugar cane. The inscription below in a crescent scroll reads Government of Sindh in both Urdu and Sindhi, respectively. The flag uses the Pakistani national colours, white and dark green, colors that reflect the Islamic heritage of Pakistan.

Other flags

See also
 Flag of Pakistan
 Sindh emblem
 List of Pakistani flags

References 

Sindh
Sindh
Sindh